Farm Credit Bank of Texas, part of the US Farm Credit System, serves as a wholesale lender and business-service provider to 14 local borrower-owned Farm Credit associations in Alabama, Louisiana, Mississippi, New Mexico and Texas.

Farm Credit Bank of Texas is a federated cooperative owned by the local Farm Credit association cooperatives, which directly finance rural real estate, agricultural production, country homes and agribusiness firms. Together with the other three banks of the Farm Credit System (AgFirst Farm Credit Bank, Columbia, South Carolina; AgriBank FCB, St. Paul, Minnesota; and CoBank, ACB, Denver, Colorado), the bank generates funds from the issuance of debt securities in the national and international financial markets through the Federal Farm Credit Banks Funding Corporation, a joint subsidiary of the banks of the Farm Credit System. These debt securities are the joint and several liabilities of the banks of the Farm Credit System and are neither guaranteed by the federal government nor backed by the full faith and credit of the federal government. The Farm Credit Insurance Fund is available to protect investors in Farm Credit System debt securities.

As of September 2008, the long-term debt of the Farm Credit System carries the ratings of AAA from Standard & Poor's Rating Service and Fitch Ratings and AAA from Moody's Investors Service.  As of the same date, the Farm Credit System's short-term debt carries the ratings of A-1+, F1+ and P-1, respectively, from the three rating agencies.

History
Farm Credit Bank of Texas is the product of the 1988 merger of the Federal Land Bank of Texas and Federal Intermediate Credit Bank of Texas. These banks were known as the Federal Land Bank of Houston and the Federal Intermediate Credit Bank of Houston prior to changing their names in 1979, and were located in Houston from their respective founding dates of 1916 and 1923 until they relocated to Austin in 1982.

See also 
 Farm Credit of New Mexico, ACA

References

External links
 

Farm Credit System
Companies based in Austin, Texas
Agriculture in Texas